Juliane Junghans (1773-1819) was a stage actor. She was engaged at the Estates Theatre in Prague in 1811-1819, where she performed mother roles in comedies and soprano parts in operettas. She was the mother of the actors Karl Heinrich Junghans (1804-1831), Julie Junghans and Marie Junghans.

References 

 http://encyklopedie.idu.cz/index.php/Junghans_Juliane

19th-century Czech actors
1773 births
1819 deaths
Date of birth missing